Kazimierz Adam Wiatr (born 18 February 1955) is a Polish politician. He was elected to the Senate of Poland (10th term) representing the constituency of Tarnów.

References 

Living people
1955 births
Place of birth missing (living people)
20th-century Polish politicians
21st-century Polish politicians
Members of the Senate of Poland 2019–2023